Desperados III is a 2020 real-time tactics video game developed by Mimimi Games and published by THQ Nordic. It is the newest installment in the Desperados series since the 2007 spin-off title Helldorado, and it was released for Microsoft Windows, PlayStation 4, Xbox One, Linux, and macOS.

Gameplay

Desperados III is a real-time tactics stealth video game, where players need to clear specific objectives while navigating through the vast maps. Players can crouch and hide in bushes to avoid enemies' sight, which is displayed as green cones of vision; if the player is caught by it, the cone will start filling yellow, and if it reaches the player, it'll turn red and the enemy will be alerted of the player's position. It is possible to navigate the map without alerting the enemies.

Players can assassinate enemies silently or use environmental kills for accidental deaths. It is possible to complete missions without killing anyone, by knocking out and tying up enemies with ropes. Bodies of dead or incapacitated enemies can be hidden inside bushes, houses, and even inside wells; if those bodies are found by patrolling enemies, they will trigger an alarm that calls for reinforcement.

To add an extra layer of strategy, players can utilize the "showdown mode" to temporarily pause the game and coordinate chained actions of the squad. In showdown mode, players can issue commands to each of the characters in the party. When finished, the player can press the "execute" button, making the characters act out the commands issued by the player simultaneously. The player can also issue each command separately with specific hotkeys.

The game features a cast of five playable characters, with each having their own attributes and having access to unique weapons and abilities:

 Cooper: he can lob coins to make noise and distract enemies temporarily, and can also throw his knife to kill enemies from a medium distance. John can shoot two enemies at the same time with showdown mode. He has the second fastest running speed, can climb ivies and ropes, and can also swim. He has the fastest melee takedown.
 McCoy: he can use bandages to heal himself or his allies. He can throw his bag on the ground, which, if caught by the enemies' cone of vision, will attract them (except Ponchos and Longcoats); if the enemy reaches and attempts to open the bag, a powder inside of it explodes, temporarily blinding the victim. McCoy can also lob gas vials that will knock out enemies in range (except for Longcoats). Lastly, he serves as the sniper of the group, carrying a colt with a silencer and a scope. McCoy has the slowest running speed and melee takedown, and cannot climb ivies, ropes, or swim. He also moves very slowly when carrying bodies.
 Hector: he's the only character capable of taking down Longcoats alone. He can arm a massive bear trap on the ground, which will kill any enemy that steps on it (except for Longcoats). He can also whistle to call the attention of enemies, who will investigate the area (except for Ponchos and Longcoats), which plays well with his trap. Hector carries a shotgun that hits all enemies in a cone in front of him, allowing him to kill multiple enemies at once. He can carry two bodies at once, at normal speed, and can even throw them freely. He cannot climb ivies, ropes, or swim.
 Kate: she can use disguises and blend in to distract enemies, although Longcoats and dogs will see through it and attack. She can also throw perfume vials to temporarily blind opponents, severely reducing their cones of vision. Kate is very limited as she lacks a lethal takedown and cannot tie enemies. She also cannot climb ivies, ropes, or swim, and has the second slowest running speed.
 Isabelle: she can use darts to connect two enemies, making any interaction affect both; for instance, if one is killed, the other will be too. She can also use another type of dart to mind-control enemies while sacrificing a portion of her health; mind-controlled enemies can perform specific actions, which will trigger retaliation from other enemies (but won't trigger alarms). Isabelle can also use her cat Stella to distract enemies, and can also heal herself and party members, which recovers less health than McCoy's bandages, but has a shorter cooldown. Isabelle has the fastest movement speed (walking, running, and even crouching), can climb ivies and ropes, and can also swim.

Story
The story is a prequel to Desperados: Wanted Dead or Alive, the first game in the series, and explores the origin of the series' protagonist John Cooper. The game is set in the Wild West in the 1870s and features various locations including Colorado, Louisiana and Mexico. It borrows several elements from the Spaghetti Western movie Once Upon a Time in the West, including the main villain's name "Frank", a railway company tycoon as a secondary enemy, and the fictional town Flagstone as one of its mission settings. In addition to John Cooper, the game also includes Hector Mendoza, Doc McCoy, Isabelle Moreau, and Kate O'Hara as playable characters.

The story follows bounty hunter John Cooper as he pursues Frank, a notorious bandit leader responsible for killing John's father, James Cooper. Along the way, Cooper meets Doctor McCoy, who was hired by the DeVitt Company, a wealthy corporation, to defend the train Cooper was taking on his way to the town of Flagstone. Once in Flagstone, Cooper learns from his friend Hector Mendoza that Frank is at the mansion of the soon-to-be-married local mayor. In the meantime, the mayor's prospective bride, Kate O'Hara, finds out that her betrothed has sold her family's ranch to DeVitt. In the escalating altercation, O'Hara shoots the mayor as John Cooper walks in, seeking Frank. The newly met pair promptly escape the mansion and head for the O'Hara ranch to defend it from the attacking DeVitt company men. The defense is successful, but Kate's uncle Ian perishes in the battle.

The group eventually gets captured on their way to New Orleans, where Frank, who is working for DeVitt, is located. A Voodoo practitioner called Isabelle Moreau rescues them. Together, they set out to find her partner, Marshall Wayne, who disappeared while investigating DeVitt. Frank's gang has imprisoned many people out in the Louisiana wetlands, to be shipped off to work in DeVitt's mines. Once they rescue Wayne, the group sets fire to the old riverboat that functions as a headquarters for Frank's people. This act puts Frank on alert, and he locks down the city. Having sneaked past the roadblocks and guards, Cooper asserts that he wants to face Frank alone, to which Kate and Hector object. At Hector's mention of James Cooper's fate, John snaps and shoots Hector in the arm. Alone, he proceeds onto a docked freight ship, where he and Frank duel. Cooper is outdrawn and wounded.

The entire group gets captured again and sent to DeVitt's mines as slaves. They eventually escape after a week, but McCoy cuts his losses and abandons them. The others undertake Wayne's commission to abduct DeVitt himself from a lavish party at this mansion. They manage to spirit DeVitt out, but at the last moment, their captive outwits them and holds them at gunpoint, only to be disabled by the returning McCoy. With the group back together, they hunt down Frank at the Devil's Canyon, where James Cooper and a young John pursued Frank years ago. Frank and John have another stand-off, watched over by Frank's lieutenants. The rest of the group overpowers Frank's posse, while John outdraws and finishes off Frank.

Development
The game was developed by German studio Mimimi Games, the developer of Shadow Tactics: Blades of the Shogun, which borrows many gameplay mechanics and assets from this game; Cooper, for instance, plays very similar to Hayato. Desperados III also uses the same game engine, Unity, which allowed Mimimi Games to adapt and improve many of the aspects from Shadow Tactics into this game. THQ Nordic, which acquired the rights to the franchise from Atari in 2013, served as the game's publisher. Since the last game in the series was released more than a decade ago, the team made Desperados III a prequel story so that it can be accessible to new players who are new to the franchise or new to the genre. To achieve this, the team ensured that the game features an adequate tutorial system that teaches the player the gameplay foundation, and implemented gamepad controls for players who use a controller to play. The game's showdown mode, which allows players to pause time completely, was created after receiving players' feedback about the limitations of Shadow Tacticss "shadow mode". Unlike Shadow Tactics, the game features a more playful tone, with characters bantering with each other more frequently.

The game was officially announced by THQ Nordic in August 2018. Initially set to be released in 2019, the game was released on 16 June 2020 for Microsoft Windows, PlayStation 4 and Xbox One, and on 2 September 2020 for Linux and macOS.

Updates and Expansions
Beginning in July 2020, Mimimi and THQ Nordic started supplying free updates for the game, which include additional mission scenarios. The first updates entail a loose frame story, titled The Baron's Challenge, in which the main characters get hired by an enigmatic figure, who is simply known as the Baron, to undertake certain missions for the entertainment of his patrons. Each mission can be unlocked with the successful completion of one or several levels in the main game. While the settings are basically the same as in the main story, each of the 14 new missions includes a different objective, sometimes with the characters having their in-play options restricted. In one example the player is required to eliminate certain enemies using environmental kills only, meaning that their other weapons are locked down for the scenario's duration.

Between September and November, Mimimi and THQ Nordic also began publishing a purchasable three-part DLC story expansion, titled "Money for the Vultures". The plot is set three months after the events in the main game; Rosie, an NPC previously met in Baton Rouge (Mission 7), hires Cooper's group to hunt for the hidden wealth of Vincent DeVitt.

In December, two new updates were provided: The "Veteran Bounty Hunter Mode", which allows the player to optionally add the other protagonists to a level where any of them were originally not available (this option does not exist for the Baron's Challenges), and the "Level Editor Light", a cheat which allows (in the PC version only) the complete rearrangement of a mission map's characters and items.

Reception

Desperados III received "generally favorable" reviews, according to review aggregator Metacritic.

IGN enjoyed the game's character interactions, saying they gave charm to an otherwise standard Western, "Their contextual banter as you make your way through each murderous mission really helps to define their individual personalities, making for an outlaw gang I was consistently happy to be at the reins of". GameSpot praised the save system, writing that it gave the player freedom to take risks without consequence, "What's remarkable is that this quick-save and quick-load routine never becomes frustrating. Instead it feels liberating. You're free to try new things and give all kinds of wild ideas a shot". USgamer felt the distinct characters rewarded mastery of their abilities, "The stringent focus of each character allows Mimimi to craft each level with those characters in mind... Desperados 3 rewards the player's knowledge of how team fits together and where skill overlap and diverge".

While liking the showdown system, PC Gamer criticized the visuals as being mostly uninteresting, "Though they're impressive stealth sandboxes, none of the maps are lookers. There's a lot of mud, sand and ramshackle buildings, and while the gang's journey takes them across a few regions, a lot of the maps lack a distinct visual identity, especially compared to Shadow Tactics". Rock Paper Shotgun praised the character of Isabelle Moreau, feeling she was a standout from the cast, "Nicely voiced by Debra Wilson, and possessing two voodoo-inspired abilities that are refreshingly different and a hoot to use, the sickle-wielding Creole sorceress is a lovely addition to the canon. Busy 'connecting' foes and mind-controlling them, I'd be surprised if series veterans found themselves missing Mia Yung, Sam Williams, and Hawkeye".

It was nominated for the category of Best Sim/Strategy game at The Game Awards 2020.

References

External links
 
 

2020 video games
Desperados (video game series)
PlayStation 4 games
Real-time tactics video games
Stealth video games
Single-player video games
THQ Nordic games
Video game prequels
Video games developed in Germany
Video games set in Colorado
Video games set in Louisiana
Video games set in Mexico
Video games set in New Mexico
Western (genre) video games
Windows games
Xbox Cloud Gaming games
Xbox One games